Vahlkampfia avara is a species of excavates. It has a PAS-positive surface layer and forms cysts in culture.

References

Further reading

External links
TOLweb entry on genus
images
EOL entry
UniProte entry

Percolozoa
Species described in 1967